The 2005 Central Michigan Chippewas football team represented Central Michigan University during the 2005 NCAA Division I-A football season. Central Michigan competed as a member of the West Division of the Mid-American Conference (MAC). The Chippewas were led by second-year head coach Brian Kelly.

Schedule

References

Central Michigan
Central Michigan Chippewas football seasons
Central Michigan Chippewas football